FC Bentonit Ijevan, is a defunct Armenian football club from the town of Ijevan, Tavush Province.

History
The club was founded in 1977 FC Bentonit Ijevan. In 1992, it was renamed Kaen Ijevan, and later in 1993 it was known as BMA Ijevan. After a brief retirement between 1994 and 1995 the club participated in the 1996–1997 Armenian First League competition as FC Kaen Ijevan. The club did not participate in the domestic competitions between 1997 and 1999. In 2002, the club entered another period of interval until 2006. In 2007, they played a single season in the First League as FC Bentonit Ijevan under the ownership of the "Ijevan Bentonit Combine OJSC", before being dissolved in 2007.

League Record

References

Bentonit Ijevan
2007 disestablishments in Armenia